The 1978–79 season was the 33rd season of competitive football played by NK Dinamo Zagreb since the foundation of the Yugoslav First League.

First Federal League

Matches

Classification

Results by round

Results summary

N.B. Points awarded for a win: 2

Yugoslav Cup

Players

Squad statistics
Appearances for competitive matches only. Age as of 12 August 1978, first match day of the season.
Source:

See also
1978–79 Yugoslav First League
1978–79 Yugoslav Cup

Bibliography

External links
 Dinamo Zagreb official website

1978-79
Yugoslav football clubs 1978–79 season